The Phenom could refer to

The Phenom (film), a 2016 sports drama film starring Ethan Hawke
The Undertaker, a professional wrestler with World Wrestling Entertainment
Vitor Belfort, a Brazilian mixed martial arts fighter
Kiefer Ravena, a Filipino basketball player